Pomaderris racemosa is a species of flowering plant in the family Rhamnaceae and is endemic to south-eastern Australia. It is a shrub or small tree with densely hairy branchlets, egg-shaped to broadly elliptic leaves, and racemes or panicles of cream-coloured flowers.

Description
The upper surface of the leaves is more or less glabrous and the lower surface is covered with soft, star-shaped hairs. Flowering occurs from October to December.

Taxonomy
Pomaderris racemosa was first formally described in 1834 by William Jackson Hooker in The Journal of Botany from specimens collected by Robert William Lawrence in 1831.

Distribution and habitat
This pomaderris grows in sheltered forest or in scrub from south-eastern South Australia to Rosedale in Victoria and in scattered locations along rivers and on the edges of lakes in Tasmania.

References

Flora of Victoria (Australia)
Flora of South Australia
Flora of Tasmania
Plants described in 1834
racemosa
Taxa named by William Jackson Hooker